Denali Borough School District is a school district headquartered in Healy, Alaska, serving the Denali Borough. As of the 2019-20 school year, it enrolls 1,000 students across four schools.

Schools
The district operates three traditional K-12 schools, as well as Denali PEAK Correspondence, a homeschool program open to students from anywhere in the state. 
 Anderson School (33 students)
 Cantwell School (10 students)
 Tri-Valley School (176 students)

References

External links
 

School districts in Alaska
 Denali Borough, Alaska